The 22403 /04 Puducherry–New Delhi Express is a Express train belonging to Indian Railways – Northern Railway zone that runs between  and  in India via Chennai Egmore.

It operates as train number 22403 from Puducherry to New Delhi and as train number 22404 in the reverse direction, serving the states of Puducherry, Tamil Nadu, Andhra Pradesh, Telangana, Maharashtra, Madhya Pradesh, Rajasthan, Uttar Pradesh, Haryana & Delhi.

Service

Routing

The 22403 / 04 Puducherry–New Delhi Express runs from Puducherry via ,, Warangal, Balharshah, Bhopal Junction, Agra Cantonment,  to New Delhi.

Timing

22403 – Starts from Puducherry every Wednesday at 9:50 AM and reaches New Delhi on Friday 00:10 AM IST.
22404 – Starts for New Delhi on every Sunday at 23:15 hrs IST and reaches Puducherry on Tuesday at 13:15 hrs IST.

Traction

As this route is electrified, a Ghaziabad-based WAP-4 powers the train up to its destination.

Coach composition
The coach composition of the 22403 / 22404 train is:

 1 AC First Class 
 2 AC Two Tier
 6 AC Three Tier
 6 Sleeper coaches
 2 General Unreserved
 2 End-on Generator car (EOG)

References

External links
22403 Puducherry New Delhi Superfast Express at India Rail Info
22404 New Delhi Puducherry Superfast Express at India Rail Info

Transport in Delhi
Transport in Puducherry
Express trains in India
Rail transport in Puducherry
Rail transport in Tamil Nadu
Rail transport in Andhra Pradesh
Rail transport in Telangana
Rail transport in Maharashtra
Rail transport in Madhya Pradesh
Rail transport in Uttar Pradesh
Rail transport in Delhi
Railway services introduced in 2011